Ghazale bin Muhamad is a Malaysian politician and served as Malacca State Executive Councillor.

Election results

Honours

Honours of Malaysia
  :
  Companion of the Order of the Defender of the Realm (JMN) (2013)
  :
  Companion Class I of the Exalted Order of Malacca (DMSM) – Datuk (2009)
  Knight Commander of the Exalted Order of Malacca (DCSM) – Datuk Wira (2016)

References 

Malaysian people of Malay descent
Malaysian Muslims
United Malays National Organisation politicians
21st-century Malaysian politicians
Members of the Malacca State Legislative Assembly
Malacca state executive councillors
People from Malacca
Living people
Year of birth missing (living people)
Companions of the Order of the Defender of the Realm